The Nash Rocky Mount Early College is a 9–13 public high school in Rocky Mount, North Carolina, United States.

Students attending the early college attend for either four or five years, instead of just the traditional four. However, instead of receiving just a high school diploma, they also get a two-year associate degree or two years of college transfer credit.

References

Public high schools in North Carolina
Schools in Nash County, North Carolina